Cytochrome b5 deficiency is a rare condition and form of isolated 17,20-lyase deficiency caused by deficiency in cytochrome b5, a small hemoprotein that acts as an allosteric factor to facilitate the interaction of CYP17A1 (17α-hydroxylase/17,20-lyase) with P450 oxidoreductase (POR), thereby allowing for the 17,20-lyase activity of CYP17A1. The condition affects both adrenal and gonadal androgen biosynthesis and results in male pseudohermaphroditism. The principal biological role of cytochrome b5 is reduction of methemoglobin, so cytochrome b5 deficiency can also result in elevated methemoglobin levels and/or methemoglobinemia, similarly to deficiency of cytochrome b5 reductase (methemoglobin reductase).

References

External links
  – Methemoglobinemia due to deficiency of cytochrome b5

{{DISPLAYTITLE:Cytochrome b5 deficiency}}

Endocrine gonad disorders
Rare diseases
Intersex variations